Wararayuq (Quechua warara horn, -yuq a suffix to indicate ownership, "the one with a horn", Hispanicized spelling Huararayoc) is a  mountain in the Paryaqaqa mountain range in the Andes of Peru. It is located in the Lima Region, Huarochirí Province, Quinti District. Wararayuq lies northwest of Qullqi P'ukru.

References

Mountains of Peru
Mountains of Lima Region